Trochtelfingen is a town in the district of Reutlingen, Baden-Württemberg, Germany. It is situated 20 km south of Reutlingen.

References 

Towns in Baden-Württemberg
Reutlingen (district)